Big Butte Springs are natural springs located near the south fork of Big Butte Creek in Jackson County, Oregon, about  north of Medford. It provides  of high quality water per day. The springs provide enough water to meet the needs of the valley for seven months of the year. During the remaining five months, water is pumped and treated from the Rogue River. The springs provide water to over 115,000 customers.

Water quality

The springs are fed by an  watershed. The water requires minimal treatment to meet water quality standards. The hardness of the springs' water has declined in recent years. In 2007, the springs were tested in 120 different areas, exceeding federal standards in all of them.
The springs have very little chemical pollution, and low turbidity. The flow of the springs remains steady throughout the year.

History

Beginning in 1908, Medford received drinking water from Fish Lake.
Several years later, the surrounding land was not cleared of debris when the Fish Lake dam was expanded. Soon, the woody debris rotted, and the water was determined undrinkable.
In 1951, another pipeline was added.

References

Springs of Oregon
Bodies of water of Jackson County, Oregon